Midnight Train to Georgia is a compilation album by American soul singer Cissy Houston, released in 1995 on Ichiban Records. The album consist of songs recorded when she was on the Janus Records label, which released her debut album, Presenting Cissy Houston, as well as bonus tracks.

The songs were produced by Donald Rubin, Charles Koppelman, Bob Finz, Sonny Limbo, Don Davis and Cissy Houston. Featured tracks include the album's hit singles "Be My Baby" and "I'll Be There";  cover songs "I Just Don't Know What to Do with Myself", "He-I Believe", and her version of "Midnight Train to Georgia", which was later covered by Gladys Knight & The Pips.

The album's liner notes includes special messages from her daughter pop/R&B singer Whitney Houston and R&B singer Luther Vandross.

Track listing

Personnel
Producers: Charles Koppelman, Donald Rubin, Donald RubinBert DeCoteaux, Cissy Houston, Sonny Limbo, Don Davis, Bob Finz

Credits
Ichiban Records Distribution

References

External links
Cissy Houston Bio
Cissy Houston music

1995 albums
Cissy Houston albums
Ichiban Records albums